Castledillon is a townland and former parish on the River Liffey near Straffan situated on the banks of the River Liffey 25 km upstream from the Irish capital Dublin.

Etymology
The Irish name Disert-Iolladhan (Disertillan) translates as Iolladhan's or Illan's hermitage. The word Castle was substituted for Disert as in last name. Ilann’s feast day is listed as 2 Feb in the Martyrology of Tallaght and he was accorded a genealogy which indicated close kinship with the Ui Dunglainge kings of Leinster. The ancient Irish genealogy claims that Cormac: second son of Olioll, was King of Leinster for nine years; abdicated A.D. 515, and died a monk at Bangor, 567, had: 1. Cairbre Dubh, King of Leinster, who died in 546; 2. Felim, from whom descended Cormac, of Tullac; 3. Iolladon, priest of Desert Iolladoin (now "Castledillon"), who had St. Criotan (11 May), of Magh Credan and Acadfinnech (on the river Dodder), and of Crevagh Cruagh, co. Dublin. In 1202 Thomas de Hereford granted Thillerdelan to St Wolstan’s religious community in nearby Celbridge.

Medieval landmarks
By 1294 the church of Tristeyldelane was described as "not worth the services of chaplains" in the Calendar of Christ Church deeds. The site is now identified by a pile of stones and one headstone, erected in 1758 to the Spellissy family. The Castledillon Friars Stone, probably erected for a 15th-century abbot of St Wolstan’s (four miles to the east), remained on the site until removed to the Visitor centre in Kildare town.

Castle
In 1271 William de Mandesham of Kavesham was granted the lands of Tristildelane. The tower house of Castledillon passed to the de Hereford and Rochford families (1359). It was burned in the wars of 1641-2 but uniquely was recorded in the 1659 census as "being since repaired by Mrs Bowell" increased in value from £60 to £50. It remained intact until the 18th century until it rapidly fell into disrepair and stones were removed from the site – now only the foundations remain. In 1557 Patrick Sarsfield of Tisteldalen, great great granduncle of Patrick Sarsfield of Siege of Limerick fame, obtained a pardon from the English colonial government and in 1560 obtained the lease of White Church alias Tullatipper. Monitoring of development undertaken on 25–26 July 2001 led to the recovery of pottery sherds of both medieval and post-medieval date from a layer of fill. This material was introduced to the site, at some unknown time in the past, in order to fill a natural hollow.

Castledillon Friar’s Stone
An incised slab with a priest, which was removed from Castledillon, is now in the visitor centre in Kildare town. The stone has been damaged and although the inscription ICI GiST DEV DE SA ALLME EIT MERCI is visible, it is a generic phrase which translates as "Here Lies (name illegible) God Have Mercy on His Soul." The absence of a crosier has been noted to suggest he was not a bishop, as accorded in folklore, and may have been abbot in the friary of St Wolstan’s four miles to the north east, perhaps after it was dissolved in 1541. The left hand of the carved figure carries a reliquary suspended around the neck and hangs below a brooch like object at the throat. His right hand rests palm downward on the chest.

Spellisy headstone
The last remaining headstone in the graveyard bears the inscription:
IHS
This Burial place
Belongs to Cornelues
Spellicy & posterity
Where Lyeth ys body
Of Ann Spellicy who
Died August ye 1th 1758
Adge 15. Allso Iudeth
Lesther, & John Spellicy

Firing range
During the 1914-18 war the British Army set up a firing range on "The Butts," McKenna’s land in Castledillon. A popular folk song from the first world war contains the following verses:

There is an isolated, desolated spot I’d like to mention/ Where all the folks quick march or stand to attention/ It’s miles away from anywhere, bedad it is a rum one/ A chap lived there for fifty years and never saw a woman

And when the war is over we’ll capture Kaiser Billy/ To shoot him would be merciful and absolutely silly/ So send him down to Castledillon among the mud and clay/ And let the Crown Prince watch him, as he slowly fades away

Bibliography
Ardclough Churches 1985 Souvenir Brochure. 
Barton, Derick: Memories of Ninety Years: An Autobiography (Privately published 1985)
Corry, Eoghan and Tancred, Jim: Annals of Ardclough (Ardclough GAA 2004).
Fitzgerald, Walter: Castledillon (Kildare Journal Archaeological Society Vol VI 1909).
 Fitzpatrick, W J: Life, Times and contemporaries of Lord Cloncurry (1855).  
Gilleece, Dermot: The Ryder Cup 2006: Ireland's Legacy (Red Rock Press 14 Oct 2005) 
Kelly, Martin J: Owners and tenants of Barberstown Castle (Kildare Journal Archaeological Society 1975).
Journals of the Kildare Archaeological Society: Volume II : 259, 283.   Volume IV : 114.   Volume VI : 207-213.   Volume XII : 265.
 Lawless, Valentine, Lord Cloncurry: Recollections (Dublin 1849). Online version available: 
Reid, Philip:"The Cup: How the 2006 Ryder Cup Was Won" by John Mooney and Michael O'Toole, published in 200 by Maverick House Publishers ).

Townlands of County Kildare
Civil parishes of County Kildare